Rear Admiral Jonathan Paul Earley,  is a senior officer in the Royal Australian Navy (RAN). He served as Commander Australian Fleet from June to December 2022, before taking over as the Deputy Chief of Navy on 16 December 2022.

Naval career
As part of the 2017 Australia Day Honours, Earley was awarded the Conspicuous Service Cross for "outstanding achievement and devotion to duty in maritime operational and humanitarian response planning and deployment."

References

Australian military personnel of the Iraq War
Australian military personnel of the War in Afghanistan (2001–2021)
Living people
Recipients of the Commendation for Distinguished Service
Recipients of the Conspicuous Service Cross (Australia)
Royal Australian Navy admirals
Year of birth missing (living people)